The 2020 Logitech G World RX of Catalunya was the seventh and eighth round of the seventh season of the FIA World Rallycross Championship. The event was held at the Circuit de Barcelona-Catalunya in Montmeló, Catalonia.

Due to the COVID-19 pandemic, the event became the last double header (two races in a weekend) of season after cancellation of World RX events in Spa and Nurburgring.

Supercar Race 1 

Source

Heats

Semi-finals 

 Semi-Final 1

 Semi-Final 2

Final

Supercar Race 2 

Source

Heats

Semi-finals 

 Semi-Final 1

 Semi-Final 2

Final

Standings after the event 

Source

 Note: Only the top six positions are included.

References 

|- style="text-align:center"
|width="35%"|Previous race:2020 World RX of Riga-Latvia
|width="40%"|FIA World Rallycross Championship2020 season
|width="35%"|Next race:2021 World RX of Barcelona-Catalunya
|- style="text-align:center"
|width="35%"|Previous race:2019 World RX of Catalunya
|width="40%"|World RX of Catalunya
|width="35%"|Next race:2021 World RX of Barcelona-Catalunya
|- style="text-align:center"

Spain
World RX